Store may refer to:

Enterprises
 Retail store, a shop where merchandise is sold, usually products and usually on a retail basis, and where wares are often kept
 App store, an online retail store where apps are sold,  included in many mobile operating systems
 Department store, a retail store offering a wide range of consumer goods
 Warehouse club (or wholesale club), a no-frills retail store, usually selling a wide variety of merchandise, in which customers may buy large, wholesale quantities at low prices 
Warehouse, a location where items are stored, e.g., a ship's paint store, and sometimes sold, e.g., Costco Warehouse Club

Arts, entertainment, and media
The Store (ITV), a British shopping television programming on ITV1
The Store (novel), a 1932 novel by Thomas Sigismund Stribling
 "Store", a song by Carly Rae Jepsen from the EP Emotion: Side B

Other uses
Data store, a repository for persistently storing and managing collections of data
Štore, a town and a municipality in eastern Slovenia
Store, expendables released from an aircraft, such as aircraft ordnance or countermeasures
Store, or store up, a verb meaning to compile or accumulate in a location such as a warehouse or grain silo
Jonas Gahr Støre, Prime Minister of Norway

See also
Storage (disambiguation)
Store and forward
Store-within-a-store
Archive
, includes several Scandinavian geographical locations